Ali Bakhta (born 13 August 1961) is an Algerian sprinter. He competed in the men's 200 metres at the 1984 Summer Olympics.

References

External links
 

1961 births
Living people
Athletes (track and field) at the 1984 Summer Olympics
Algerian male sprinters
Olympic athletes of Algeria
Place of birth missing (living people)
21st-century Algerian people